Bill Demory (born December 1, 1950) is a retired American football quarterback. He is currently a professor of economics at Central Arizona College.

Football career
Demory played for the University of Arizona Wildcats and for the New York Jets of the NFL, for whom he started three games in weeks 5-7 of the 1973 season.  In Demory's three starts, the Jets beat the New England Patriots, though Demory was only 1 for 7 on passing, and nonetheless received praise from coach Weeb Ewbank and the Jets' top quarterback Joe Namath,
 and lost to the Pittsburgh Steelers and the Denver Broncos.

Later life
After football, Demory went to graduate school, receiving an M.B.A. from the University of Iowa and an M.A. in Economics and Entrepreneurship for Educators from the University of Delaware.  He is currently a professor of economics at Central Arizona College.

References

1950 births
American football quarterbacks
Arizona Wildcats football players
Living people
New York Jets players
People from Indianola, Iowa
University of Arizona alumni
University of Delaware alumni
University of Iowa alumni
Players of American football from Iowa
Economists from Arizona
Economists from Iowa
21st-century American economists